Hans Robert Schöler (born 30 January 1953) is a molecular biologist and stem cell researcher. He is director at the Max Planck Institute for Molecular Biomedicine in Münster.

Biography
Hans Schöler was born in 1953 in Toronto, Canada, came to Germany in 1960 and grew up in Paderborn, Munich and Heidelberg. After his studies of Biology at the University of Heidelberg, Schöler conducted the research for his doctoral degree from the University of Heidelberg in 1985 at the Centre for Molecular Biology (ZMBH). 

After having headed a research group for Boehringer Mannheim at the Research Center Tutzing and having worked as a staff scientist at the Max Planck Institute for Biophysical Chemistry in Göttingen, Schöler started as head of a research group at the European Molecular Biology Laboratory (EMBL) in Heidelberg in 1991. In 1994, he obtained his habilitation at the Biological Faculty of the Heidelberg University.

In 1999, Hans Schöler left Germany to assume a professorship for Reproductive Physiology at the School of Veterinary Medicine University of Pennsylvania, USA. At the same time, he was director of the Center for Animal Transgenesis and Germ Cell Research at the University of Pennsylvania, Philadelphia, USA. From 2000 until 2004, Schöler held the Marion Dilley and David George Jones Chair for Reproductive Medicine.

Since 2004, Hans Schöler has been director of the Department Cell and Developmental Biology Max Planck Institute for Molecular Biomedicine, Münster. He is professor of the Medical Faculty of the Westfälischen Wilhelms-Universität Münster and also adjunct professor of the University of Pennsylvania and the Hannover Medical School.

Research
Schöler's major research interests are the molecular biology of cells of the germline (pluripotent cells and germ cells), transcriptional regulation of genes in the mammalian germline, deciphering the molecular processes of reprogramming somatic cells after induction with transcription factors, nuclear transfer into oocytes, or fusion with pluripotent cells.

Nearly 277 of Schöler's publications are listed in the i10 Index. These publications were cited over 50,000 times. His Hirsch-Index is 104 (status December 2022).

Awards 
 2008: Robert Koch Prize together with Irving Weissman and Shinya Yamanaka
 2010: The Ulsan National Institute of Science and Technology (UNIST) inaugurated the 'Hans Schöler Stem Cell Research Center'
 2011: Kazemi Prize
 2011: Emil von Behring Lecture
 2011: Max Delbrück Medal

Memberships in professional and scientific societies or commissions 
 since 1995	Member of the American Association for the Advancement of Science
 since 1999	Center for Animal Transgenesis and Germ Cell Research, University of Pennsylvania
 2003-2006	Member of the Advisory Council “Biological and Genetic Technologies” of the Christian Democrat Parliamentary Party of the German Parliament
 since 2004	Member of the Managing Board of the Stem Cell Network North Rhine Westphalia, Düsseldorf (Head of the Managing Board since January 2005)
 since 2004	Member of the German National Academy of Sciences Leopoldina
 since 2004	Full Professor of the Medical Faculty of the University of Münster, Germany
 since 2005	Member of the North Rhine-Westphalian Academy of Sciences
 since 2005	Representative Member of the Central Ethics Committee for Stem Cell Research (full member since July 2008)
 since 2006	Member of the Center for Bioethics of the University of Münster, Germany
 since 2010	Member of the Berlin-Brandenburg Academy of Sciences and Humanities, Biomedical Class
 since 2011	Member of the Academy of Sciences and Literature, Mainz
 since 2000	Co-editor of the journal Molecular Reproduction and Development
 since 2001	Co-editor of the journal Cloning and Stem Cells
 since 2005	Co-editor of the journal Stem Cells
 since 2006	Co-editor of the Zeitschrift für Regenerative Medizin
 since 2006	Co-editor of the journal Cell Stem Cell
 since 2008	Co-editor of the journal Cell
 since 2009	Co-editor of the journal Stem Cell Reviews and Reports
 since 2011	Co-editor of the journal Stem Cells and Development
 since 2011	Co-editor of the journal The International Journal of Developmental Biology

References

External links 
 Homepage of the Max Planck Institute for Molecular Biomedicine
 Homepage of the stem cell platform zellux.net
 Homepage of the Stem Cell Network North Rhine Westphalia

1953 births
Living people
Canadian emigrants to Germany
Max Planck Institute directors
Heidelberg University alumni
Max Planck Society alumni
University of Pennsylvania faculty
Scientists from Toronto
Stem cell researchers
20th-century German biologists
21st-century German biologists